Mduduzi Mabaso (born 1 April 1976), is a South African actor. He is best known for the roles in the films and teleserials Blood Diamond, Machine Gun Preacher and Hotel Rwanda.

Personal life
He was born in 1976 in Alexandra, South Africa. He spent 3 years of his childhood in Transkei.

He was previously married to Veronica Maseko and the couple had two children. He is currently married to  fellow actress, Fatima Metsileng. Mabaso met her during the set of the second season of Zone 14 in 2007. They later got married and have two children. He has four children: Ntokozo, Mpumi, Njabulo and Zolile.

Career
In 1992, he first appeared in a theater production Divide and Rule. In 2004, he made film debut with the American film Hotel Rwanda directed by Terry George. The film was based on the Rwandan genocide, which occurred during the spring of 1994. Then he acted in many supportive roles in the films, Catch a Fire, Heartlines and Blood Diamond. He also acted in the stage plays: Cry The Beloved Country, Madiba’s Magic, Behind the Curtains, Shaka Zulu and Tasha On The Rocks.

In 2006, he played the lead role in the short Sekalli le Meokgo directed by Tebho Mahlatsi. The film was later awarded Best Short Film at the 2007 Durban International Film Festival.

In 2007, he was invited to play in the lead character of the South African television soap opera Rhythm City. He played the role 'Suffocate Ndlovu'. The soapie made its premier on free-to-air television channel e.tv on 9 July 2007. The serial is continuously airing up to date in South Africa with positive critical reviews. Meanwhile, Mabaso won the Golden Horn Award for Best Supporting Actor in a TV Soap and then Golden Horn Award for Best Actor in a Feature Film for his role 'Ndlovu' in the serial.

Filmography

See also
 South African Film and Television Awards
 2018 DStv Mzansi Viewers' Choice Awards

References

External links
 

Living people
20th-century South African male actors
South African male film actors
1976 births
South African male stage actors
South African male television actors
People from Alexandra, Gauteng
21st-century South African male actors